Uroš Luković (born June 8, 1989) is a Serbian professional basketball player.

Professional career
Luković played in youth categories with KK Torlak from Belgrade. In August 2007, he signed a four-year contract with FMP Železnik. For the 2009–10 season he was loaned to Radnički Basket. In March 2011, he signed with the Spanish club CAI Zaragoza. After only one month with Zaragoza, he broke his leg  and later left the club before making official debut.

In 2011, Luković signed with Kumanovo of the Macedonian League. After two seasons with Kumanovo, in August 2013, he moved to the Estonian club Tartu Ülikool/Rock. He left Tartu in November 2013. The next month, he returned to Kumanovo for the rest of the 2013–14 season. In September 2014, he signed with Kožuv. On December 4, 2014, he parted ways with Kožuv. Two days later, he returned to Kumanovo. In December 2015, he parted ways with Kumanovo. On December 15, 2015, he signed with MZT Skopje for the rest of the season. On August 9, 2016, he signed a two-year contract with Partizan.

On July 8, 2017, Luković signed a two-year contract with Mornar. He left Mornar following the end of the 2020–21 season.

On July 29, 2021, Luković signed a one-year contract with the Croatian team Zadar. In November, 2021, Luković left Zadar. On December 6, 2021, Luković signed a contract with the Montenegrin team KK Lovćen 1947. On January 25, 2022, Luković signed a contract with the Serbian team Metalac Valjevo.

Personal life
Uroš comes from a basketball family. In fact, his father Ljubisav Luković, is a former basketball player and current basketball coach, and his mother is also former basketball player. Uroš has a younger brother Marko and sister Branka who are also professional basketball players.

References

External links
 Uroš Luković at aba-liga.com
 Uroš Luković at eurobasket.com
 Uroš Luković at realgm.com

1989 births
Living people
ABA League players
Basketball League of Serbia players
Basketball players from Belgrade
Centers (basketball)
KK FMP (1991–2011) players
KK Lovćen players
KK Metalac Valjevo players
KK Mornar Bar players
KK MZT Skopje players
KK Partizan players
KK Radnički FMP players
KK Zadar players
Serbian expatriate basketball people in Croatia
Serbian expatriate basketball people in Estonia
Serbian expatriate basketball people in Montenegro
Serbian expatriate basketball people in North Macedonia
Serbian expatriate basketball people in Spain
Serbian men's basketball players
University of Tartu basketball team players